Thor Fields (born September 19, 1968) is an American actor and guitarist.

Career 
Fields began his career in television commercials and made his Broadway debut in The King and I in 1978. This was the first revival starring Yul Brynner and Constance Towers. Fields was understudy for the role of Louis (the teacher's son) and also swing for the Royal Children. Fields was also in the Turgenev play A Month in the Country (Roundabout Theater Company) starring Tammy Grimes, Farley Granger and Amanda Plummer.

In 1980, Fields was cast as Tom of Warwick in the 20th Anniversary revival production of Camelot starring Richard Burton, Christine Ebersole and Richard Muenz. In 1981, Burton was replaced by Richard Harris. Fields and the production continued to tour as well as play Broadway's Winter Garden Theatre, where it was filmed for HBO.

Fields appeared in numerous productions, including Mensch Meier at the Manhattan Theatre Club,
 Romeo in Romeo and Juliet at the American Theater of Actors, and Puck in A Midsummer Night's Dream.

Fields played the role of Erich Aldrich on the NBC soap opera The Doctors from 1977 until 1980. In 1981, he appeared with Carroll O'Connor in an episode of Archie Bunker's Place and in 1983 played Jasper Kent in Horatio Alger Updated: Frank and Fearless (ABC). On the big screen, Fields played Danny, Shelley Long's son in Hello Again, and appeared in the film Misplaced starring John Cameron Mitchell.

Personal life 
Thor Fields currently lives in the Hell's Kitchen neighborhood of Manhattan with his wife, singer Julie Reyburn.

Filmography

Film

Television

References

External links
 

1968 births
Male actors from New York (state)
American male child actors
American rock musicians
American male television actors
Living people
People from Hell's Kitchen, Manhattan
Guitarists from New York (state)
20th-century American guitarists